The 1963–64 season was Blackpool F.C.'s 56th season (53rd consecutive) in the Football League. They competed in the 22-team Division One, then the top tier of English football, finishing eighteenth.

Ray Charnley was the club's top overall scorer for the sixth consecutive season, with fifteen goals. Alan Ball, meanwhile, was the club's top scorer in the league, with thirteen goals.

Table

Notes

References

Blackpool F.C.
Blackpool F.C. seasons